Raul Martins is a former Portuguese rugby union player. He played as the number eight.

Career
Martins had 21 caps for Portugal, from 1967 to 1981, being the captain in 18 of them. After finishing his player career, he became a coach, and took charge of the U-18 National Team. Martins was the chairman of the Portuguese Rugby Board from 1987 to 1999.

He joined the FIRA-AER Executive Board in 1999. He is a member of the IRB Council.

Professionally, he is shareholder and Managing Director of a Portuguese Group of Companies in the Construction, Real Estate and Hotel Sectors.

External links
Raul Martins International Statistics
Raul Martins at the IRB Council

Living people
Portuguese rugby union players
Portuguese rugby union coaches
Rugby union number eights
Year of birth missing (living people)
Portugal international rugby union players